In complex analysis, a branch of mathematics, Morera's theorem, named after Giacinto Morera, gives an important criterion for proving that a function is holomorphic.

Morera's theorem states that a continuous, complex-valued function f defined on an  open set D in the complex plane that satisfies

for every closed piecewise C1 curve  in D must be holomorphic on D.

The assumption of Morera's theorem is equivalent to f locally having an antiderivative on D.

The converse of the theorem is not true in general. A holomorphic function need not possess an antiderivative on its domain, unless one imposes additional assumptions. The converse does hold e.g. if the domain is simply connected; this is Cauchy's integral theorem, stating that the line integral of a holomorphic function along a closed curve is zero.  

The standard counterexample is the function , which is holomorphic on C − {0}. Because of the ambiguity of θ up to the addition of any integer multiple of 2, any continuous choice of θ on U will suffice to define an antiderivative of 1/z on U.  (It is the fact that θ cannot be defined continuously on a simple closed curve containing the origin in its interior that is the root of why 1/z has no antiderivative on its entire domain C − {0}.) And because the derivative of an additive constant is 0, any constant may be added to the antiderivative and it's still an antiderivative of 1/z.

In a certain sense, the 1/z counterexample is universal: For every analytic function that has no antiderivative on its domain, the reason for this is that 1/z itself does not have an antiderivative on C − {0}.

Proof

There is a relatively elementary proof of the theorem.  One constructs an anti-derivative for f explicitly.

Without loss of generality, it can be assumed that D is connected. Then define the function F to be

And it follows that

Then using the continuity of f to estimate difference quotients, we get that F′(z) = f(z).  Had we chosen a different z0 in D, F would change by a constant: namely, the result of integrating f along any piecewise regular curve between the new  z0 and the old, and this does not change the derivative.

Since f is the derivative of the holomorphic function F, it is holomorphic. The fact that derivatives of holomorphic functions are holomorphic can be proved by using the fact that holomorphic functions are analytic, i.e. can be represented by a convergent power series, and the fact that power series may be differentiated term by term.  This completes the proof.

Applications
Morera's theorem is a standard tool in complex analysis.  It is used in almost any argument that involves a non-algebraic construction of a holomorphic function.

Uniform limits
For example, suppose that f1, f2, ... is a sequence of holomorphic functions, converging uniformly to a continuous function f on an open disc.  By Cauchy's theorem, we know that

for every n, along any closed curve C in the disc.  Then the uniform convergence implies that

for every closed curve C, and therefore by Morera's theorem f must be holomorphic.  This fact can be used to show that, for any open set , the set  of all bounded, analytic functions  is a Banach space with respect to the supremum norm.

Infinite sums and integrals
Morera's theorem can also be used in conjunction with Fubini's theorem and the Weierstrass M-test to show the analyticity of functions defined by sums or integrals, such as the Riemann zeta function

or the Gamma function

Specifically one shows that

for a suitable closed curve C, by writing

and then using Fubini's theorem to justify changing the order of integration, getting

and hence the double integral above is 0.  Similarly, in the case of the zeta function, the M-test justifies interchanging the integral along the closed curve and the sum.

Weakening of hypotheses
The hypotheses of Morera's theorem can be weakened considerably.  In particular, it suffices for the integral

to be zero for every closed (solid) triangle T contained in the region D. This in fact characterizes holomorphy, i.e. f is holomorphic on D if and only if the above conditions hold. It also implies the following generalisation of the aforementioned fact about uniform limits of holomorphic functions: if f1, f2, ... is a sequence of holomorphic functions defined on an open set  that converges to a function f uniformly on compact subsets of Ω, then f is holomorphic.

See also
Cauchy–Riemann equations
Methods of contour integration
Residue (complex analysis)
Mittag-Leffler's theorem

References
 .
 .

.
 .

External links
 
 

Theorems in complex analysis